Malakhov is a Russian family name derived from the Biblical name of Malachi. Alternative spellings include Malakov and Malakoff. The name may refer to:

Andrey Malakhov (born 1972), Russian television presenter
George Malakov (1928–1979), Ukrainian artist
Igor Malakhov (born 1979), Russian football player
Ivan Malakhov (born 1953), Russian politician
Mikhail Fedorovich Malakhov (born 1946), Kazakh judge
Mikhail Pavlovich Malakhov (1781–1842), Russian architect
Vladimir Malakhov (chess player) (born 1980), Russian chess player
Vladimir Malakhov (dancer) (born 1968), Russian dancer
Vladimir Malakhov (ice hockey) (born 1968), Russian ice hockey player
Yevgeni Malakhov (born 1982), Russian football player

Places
Malakoff, California
Malakoff, Ontario
Malakoff, Hauts-de-Seine
Malakoff, Texas

Other uses
Malakoff (power company), a Malaysian company
Malakoff (food), fried cheese balls or sticks from Western Switzerland.
Battle of Malakoff, a battle during the Siege of Sevastopol in the Crimean War. 

Russian-language surnames